Gaston Audier (27 February 1913 – 17 June 2003) was a French racing cyclist. He raced in the 1947 Tour de France.

References

External links
 

1913 births
2003 deaths
French male cyclists
Sportspeople from Drôme
Cyclists from Auvergne-Rhône-Alpes